Stenocercus scapularis is a species of lizard of the Tropiduridae family. It is found in Peru.

References

Stenocercus
Reptiles described in 1901
Reptiles of Peru
Endemic fauna of Peru
Taxa named by George Albert Boulenger